Ejen 016 is a Malaysian super secret agent action comedy drama. The drama broadcast started 21 July 2006, every Wednesday 9:30 pm on TV3. This drama is produced by DiGi Telecommunications, a mobile telecommunication company in Malaysia.

Main characters

Sel 16 teams
Ejen 016 - Saiful Apek
Ejen Alpha 0146 - Siti Elizad
Ejen Delta 0146 - Pushpa Narayan
Ejen Gamma 0146 - Shanna Avril

Enemy characters
Chief Blontok - Zakaria Hashim 
Tore - Bob Kuman

Host characters
Amber Chia
M. Nasir
Linda Onn
Jalaluddin Hassan

Theme songs
 Ejen 016 - Zaid Akbar Malik
 Taakan ku masih duduk menanti - Zaid Akbar Malik
 Wajah yang ku rindu - Zaid Akbar Malik

External links
Ejen 016 on DiGi website

Malaysian drama television series